A variety of religious emblems programs are used by the Girl Scouts of the USA (GSUSA) to encourage youth to learn about their faith and to recognize adults who provide significant service to youth in a religious environment. These religious programs are created, administered and awarded by the various religious groups and not GSUSA, though the GSUSA recognizes such programs and allows the emblem to be worn on the uniform. Many are listed by Programs of Religious Activities with Youth (P.R.A.Y.), an independent organization, as awards recognized by the Girl Scouts in an official brochure provided to Girl Scout council offices, as well as posted on the P.R.A.Y. website. The Girl Scouts also recognize that not all religions have programs that are affiliated through P.R.A.Y. and suggests contacting local religious leaders for information about those.

P.R.A.Y. listed programs and awards
The following awards are administered through the P.R.A.Y. and may be worn on the uniform upon completion of the program. The emblems and awards given to girls at the completion of the program are worn either "in a single horizontal row on the right side of the uniform blouse, level with the Girl Scout Membership Pin [on the uniform sash], or on the vest in the area below the membership stars or troop/group numerals and above the next official insignia already on the vest."

Patch programs
In addition to the official recognitions offered by each faith for girls, several faiths offer patch programs for girls who complete certain requirements and/or achieve certain goals. Because these patch programs are considered unofficial by GSUSA, they do not require formal approval from the Scouting organization, nor are they worn on the front of the uniform. Like other unofficial patches, event patches, and holiday patches, they are worn on the back of the uniform sash or vest.

P.R.A.Y. also offers its own "To Serve God" segment patch program for Girl Scouts of all ages and adult advisers of all faiths, designed to promote their religious awards programs. The name is inspired by the words "to serve God" in the Girl Scout promise. To earn the patch, girls and adults must attend or make an interfaith presentation about religious awards, then fulfill a personal commitment of their choice "to serve God", such as promoting, earning, or helping another girl earn the religious award for her faith. There are four segments for the patch. One is offered yearly, called the "anchor patch", while the other three are offered yearly on a rotational basis. After one patch is released, the previous year's patch is discontinued for the next three years, then is reinstated again for a one-year period. The program began in 2006, and as of August 2008, only two of these three patches have been released.

See also
 Religious emblems programs (Boy Scouts of America)

References

External links
Girl Scouts of the USA: Girl Scouts and Faith

nicgs.com - National Islamic Committee on Girl Scouting 

Girl Scouts of the USA